Callas may refer to:

People 
 Charlie Callas (1924–2011), American comedian and actor
 Demetri Callas (1942–2020), American rock guitarist, member of The Four Seasons
 Maria Callas, Greek soprano and opera singer
 Peter G. Callas (1926–2022), American politician and educator
 Zoe Callas, a fictional character in the USA Network series, Law & Order: Criminal Intent

Other 
 Callas (river), a river in Euboea, Greece
 Callas Forever, a 2002 film directed by Franco Zeffirelli
 Callas, Var, a commune in the Var department, in France

See also
Kallas
Calla (disambiguation)